Luis Francisco García Llamas (born April 4, 1964, in Guadalajara, Jalisco) is a Mexican football manager and former player. Since October 27, 2019 is the Atlético San Luis interim manager.

References

External links

1964 births
Living people
Mexican footballers
Mexican football managers
Atlas F.C. footballers
Deportivo Toluca F.C. players
Leones Negros UdeG footballers
Correcaminos UAT footballers
C.D. Veracruz footballers
Cruz Azul footballers
C.D. Guadalajara footballers
La Piedad footballers
Club Celaya footballers
Dorados de Sinaloa footballers
Liga MX players
Ascenso MX players
Footballers from Guadalajara, Jalisco
Association footballers not categorized by position